Vibiliidae is a family of amphipods belonging to the order Amphipoda.

Genera:
 Vibilia Milne Edwards, 1830
 Vibilioides Chevreux, 1905

References

Amphipoda
Crustacean families